Linneman is a surname. Notable people with the surname include:

Moos Linneman (1931–2020), Dutch boxer
Peter Linneman (born 1951), American businessman

See also
Linneman Building, a historic building in Lima, Ohio, United States
Linnemann